The King of the Snakes is a Chinese folktale published by John Macgowan in 1910. It tells the story of a woman who marries a snake spirit, but her sister conspires to take her place and kills her. The woman goes through a cycle of transformations, regains human form and takes revenge on her sister.

Scholars relate the tale and variants to the cycle of the animal bridegroom, but consider it a tale type that developed in East Asia, particularly China.

Summary
The tale begins by describing how a society of snakes is so refined and advanced that some of its members are dissatisfied with their low condition and wish to become humans. One of them, who becomes the ruler of the snakes, discovers how to alternate between human and snake forms, becomes human and owns a great state in the human realm. In this state, there is a beautiful garden unlike any other in the Flowery Kingdom.

One day, this Prince of Snakes sees an old man plucking flowers in his own gardens and, irritated, asks the old man the reason for his presence. The old man answers he is just plucking flowers for his four daughters, of varying charm and beauty: the eldest pock-faced and the fourth the most beautiful. He ponders on this information and demands the old man sends the fourth daughter to him as his bride in ten days time, lest he sends them a troop of snakes to devour him and his family.

The men returns home and tells the situation to his daughters. The three elders refuse to marry the snake, despite his threat, but the youngest, Almond Blossom, being the "most devotedly filial", offers to go in her father's place. The fairies listen to her plea and, touched by her devotion, send one of their own to protect her against her enemies.

On the appointed time, a sedan-chair comes to their house to get Almond Blossom as the snake's bride and to take her to her future husband. The father follows behind his daughter some days later and reaches the snake's palace. He is greeted by his daughter, who looks very pleased with her new life: a loving husband and a lavish palace. She tells her father her husband is on a journey and sends him back to his humble house with extravagant gifts.

After the father returns home, he shows the grand presents to his daughters. The eldest sister begins to nurture a jealous heart and decides to visit her youngest. She goes and admires the whole palace. She convinces Almond Blossom to show her around the property. They reach an empty well. The eldest sister shoves her own sister down the well.

After some time, the eldest sister still at the snake king's palace, a little bird flies out of the well and begins to sing a song with almost human-like qualities. The eldest sister, fearing that the bird will reveal the truth, snap the bird's neck and throws it outside the house. Some time later, a clump of bamboos grow up on the spot of the bird's remains. The eldest sister, sensing that the bamboos will also reveal the truth, gets an axe and chops them down.

Some of the snake king's servants see the chopped down bamboos and take some of them to fashion a new chair. The Snake King finally returns home and asks about his wife. The eldest sister spins a story about seeing her by the well, then nothing else, and the servants also not knowing her whereabouts. Suddenly, the chair turns into Almond Blossom, who accuses her sister of trying to kill her. Enraged, the snake king orders the execution of his sister-in-law.

Analysis

Tale type
In the first catalogue of Chinese folktales, devised by folklorist Wolfram Eberhard in 1937, Eberhard abstracted a Chinese folktype he termed Der Schlangenmann ("The Serpent Husband"). In this type, indexed as number 31 in his catalogue, a man with many daughters marries his youngest daughter to a snake or snake spirit as a promise for a favour; the snake and the girl live happily, enticing the jealousy of the eldest sister; the eldest sister shoves the youngest sister into a well and takes her place; the youngest sister becomes a bird, then a tree (or bamboo), regains human form and unmasks her treacherous sister.

Chinese folklorist and scholar  established a second typological classification of Chinese folktales, and abstracted a similar narrative sequence. He named this tale type 433D, "The Snake Husband" (or "The Snake and Two Sisters").

In a joint article in Enzyklopädie des Märchens, European scholars Bengt Holbek and John Lindow described it as a "Chinese oikotype". In that regard, researcher Juwen Zhang indicated that type 433D, "Snake boy/husband and two sisters", is an example of local Chinese tale types that are not listed in the international ATU index.

Motifs
Ting described tale type 433D as a combination of the initial part of type 425C, "Beauty and the Beast", and the second part of type 408. In the article about tale type King Lindworm in the Enzyklopädie des Märchens, Holbek and Lindow noted that Ting's new tale type combined motifs of ATU 425C, "Beauty and the Beast"; the heroine's transformation sequence that appears in tale type ATU 408, "The Love for Three Oranges", and the bird transformation from tale type ATU 720, "The Juniper Tree".

The snake husband 
In his folktype system, Eberhard indicated that in some of the variants, the supernatural husband is a snake, snake spirit or a dragon, and another type of animal in others. The number of sisters also varies between tales. He also agreed that the motif of the snake husband seemed very old.

In Ting's catalogue, he noted that the snake husband assumes human form, but it can also be a "flower god", a wolf, or a normal man.

Variants

China
According to researcher Juwen Zhang, the tale type is very popular in both China and Taiwan, with more than 200 variants collected.

Eberhard, in his 1937 catalogue, asserted the tale's spread across China, but supposed that its center of diffusion was Southern China, since most of the variants available were collected there. In turn, Ting, in his 1978 study, listed several printed variants of his type 433D, confirming the dispersal of the story in his country.

Other Chinese variants include The Snake Husband and The Story of the Cucumber Snake.

Regional tales

The Snake Bridegroom 
Researcher Juwen Zhang published a tale titled The Snake Bridegroom: an old man has two daughters, the elder ugly and lazy, and the younger beautiful and dutiful. The man goes to chop wood in the mountains and, one day, sees a cowherd cracking a whip to herd the cows and singing a song about a love interest with shining hair and dainty feet. One day, the man is sharpening an ax, and his elder daughter asks him to get some flowers from the mountain. Suddenly, the old man sing the cowherd's song, and the elder daughter answers with a song that her hair is not shining and her feet are large. The younger daughter makes the same request and, hearing the song, sings her own verses in response to the song. Suddenly, a loud noise of trumpets and a march comes from outside the house. The three leave to see the commotion, and the father notices the person ahead of the retinue is the same cowherd. The youth replies that his younger daughter replied to his song and he has come to make her his bride. The cowherd promises to treat her well and tells the old man to follow the buckwheat flowers when they are in bloom to visit his daughter. Time passes, and the old man does as instructed; he arrives at a stone slab and waits for his daughter and her husband. The couple comes, opens the stone slab and bids him follow them. They climb down several steps to a large and spacious house. The old man notices his daughter has a good material life, and she explains her husband is the Golden Cow Star (The Taurus) in the Heavens. The cowherd husband lets his wife visit her elder sisters and gifts his father-in-law with silver and gold to bring home. The old man returns home with the gifts and his younger daughter, and the eldest sister, seeing the riches they brought, regrets not marrying the cowherd and plans to replace her. Goaded by her elder sister, the younger one teaches her the secret spell to open up the stone slab. After ten days, the elder sister offers to escort the younger back home, and puts her plans into action: on the road, the elder asks the younger to try her beautiful clothes, and shoves the younger down a well. The elder opens the stone slab and tries to pass herself off as the cowherd's wife. The cowherd suspects something is amiss, but does not have time to dwell on his thoughts, for he has to herd the cows. A little bird perches on his arm, and sings about being the true wife. The cowherd decides to spy on the sister-in-law's behaviour: she kills the little bird after it mocks a pancake she was preparing, and the cowherd buries it. On the bird's grave, a jujube tree sprouts, it feeds the cowherd dates and tosses centipedes to her sister, who, enraged, chops down the tree and burns it. The cowherd gathers the ashes and places them in a bag. The ugly sister notices her clothes are dirty and goes to river to wash them, but falls in water and drowns. Meanwhile, the cowherd mourns for his lost wife, and, after 49 days, finds out she is back to life.<ref>Zhang, Juwen. The Magic Love. New York, United States of America: Peter Lang Verlag, 2021. pp. 130-137.</ref>

 The Snake and Three Sisters 
In another tale collected by Zhang with the title The Snake and Three Sisters, an old couple live bat the foot of Long White Mountains with their three beautiful daughters. The old man hunts in the mountains to provide food for his family, but one days falls ill, to the three daughters' worries. The three daughters suggests they learn to hunt, and, after their father recovers, he takes them to the mountains. One day, a "strong dark wind" blows - work of a black snake - and a youth appears to them (the black snake in human form). The youth asks the man to become his apprentice, but the man will talk to his wife first. The old couple agree to take him in as a son-in-law. The next day, the old man and the three daughters meet a white-bearded man, who tells he is a local mountain god and warns them against the youth, who is a black snake. With this new information, the old couple have a change of heart. The old man then goes to meet the youth on his own. The youth admits he is the snake spirit, but assures the man he has a kind heart and will provide him with food, clothes and silver, then makes a demand to marries one of the man's daughters, or he will hurt the human. The man goes back home and asks which of his three daughters agrees to marry the snake spirit. The elder two refuse, and are reapproached by the man, but the youngest offers herself to the snake spirit. The man goes to tell the snake spirit of his daughter's decision, and goes with him to the snake's house, where the youth promises to take care of the third daughter as his wife. He also warns that he is the only snake that can turn into a man, not his snake followers, and that her family can only visit his wife once a year. After the snake spirit goes to fetch his bride, the old woman gives her daughter two bags of mille for her to drop the grains to create a trail for her mother to follow. The girl obeys. She has a good life with the snake spirit, and her mother follows the trail of millet to the snake's cavern, but she cannot go in. The snake spirit takes her soul and shows her that her daughter is alive and living well. The old woman wakes up and meets the mountain god, who advises her to call out for her daughter for three days. The attempt works and her daughter invites her mother in. The girl suggests her mother brings her elder daughters the next time she visits. It happens so. Seeing her cadette's good life, the eldest sister begins to feel jealous and devises a vicious plan: she convinces her sister to let her stay for a few days. During her extended stay, the eldest sister takes the cadette for a stroll in the gardens, shoves her down a well, and takes her place. The snake spirit comes back home and notices his wife looks and sounds different, but believes her given explanations. One night, however, the snake spirit's true wife's soul appears in his dreams and reveals the truth. The snake spirit searches the well and finds his wife's corpse. With a spell, the eldest sister is strangled to death by her clothes, and with another, the snake spirit revives his wife.

 The Garden Snake 
In a tale published by Chinese author Lin Lan and translated by Juwen Zhang as The Garden Snake, a man goes to the mountains to chop wood and falls into a trap set by a garden snake with its skin. The man pleads for his life in name of his three daughters, which piques the snake's interest in marrying one of the man's daughters. The man goes home and inquires his daughters which will go to the garden snake; the elder two refuse, while the youngest agrees. The girl marries the snake and lives in love and luxury. One day, however, she begins to miss her family, and wishes to visit them; the garden snake agrees and gives her a pack of sesame seeds so she can plant them to mark her way home when they bloom. The girl goes back to her family's home in fine clothes and arouses the jealousy of her elder sister, who trades clothes and jewels with her and shoves the cadette down a well. The elder sister goes back to the garden snake and passes herself off as his true wife. Some time later, while she is combing her hair in front of a mirror, a black bird perches on a tree and mocks the elder sister. She throws the comb to the bird, which dies, and cooks it. The garden snake eats his portions, which become fine meat, while her portions change into bones. Annoyed, she takes the food and throws it in the garden; a jujube tree sprouts on its place, yielding delicious dates to the garden snake, and dog excrement to the sister. The false wife fells the tree and makes a washing-stick out of a tree branch, but it tears apart her clothes when it is used, so it is thrown in the fire. Some relatives of the third sister sense something is wrong and pay a visit to the garden snake's house; they find a golden figure in the ashes, bring it home and hide it in a bamboo chest. While the relatives are away, the third sister leaves the bamboo chest, spins the cotton, and hides back in the chest, until she is discovered by her relatives. At last, both sisters are brought before the garden snake; he notices the deception and confirms his true wife's identity when her hair intertwines with his. As punishment, he devours his sister-in-law and lives with his true wife.

 Mr. Snake and Lotus-Seed Face 
In a tale from Fujian collected by Zheng Huicong with the title Mr. Snake and Lotus-Seed Face, a man lives in a mountain village and works collecting pig manure, which is why people call him Pig Manure Grandfather. One day, the man passes by another village and sees a beautiful garden filled with nice flowers. He appreciates their perfume when a youth appears to him. The man explains he was admiring the flowers, since his three daughters like to wear flowers in their hair. The youth becomes interested in the man's daughters: the elder two ugly, and the youngest with a face beautiful like a lotus seed. The youth explains he was born in the year of the snake, thus he is called Mr. Snake, and wishes to marry one of the man's daughters. Pig Manure Grandfather goes back home and brings his daughters a bouquet of jasmine flowers. Back home, the girls fight over the jasmine flowers, which begin to emit a song. The man explains Mr. Snake, a farmer like him, wishes to marry one of them; the elder two, Rice-Sieve Face and Crab-Dipper Face refuse to marry a lowly farmer, while Lotus-Seed Face agrees to his marriage proposal, and goes to the rear mountain to live with Mr. Snake. They work together in the flower garden and become well off. One day, Lotus-Seed Face becomes pregnant, and her father pays her a visit. He becomes dazzled with their material wealth, and returns home to tell his other daughters their sisters did fare well in her marriage. The elder sisters become jealous of their cadette's good fortune, but are chastised by their father. Despite the reproach, the pair secretly plan to steal Lotus-Seed Face's life for themselves. Some time later, the girls visit their cadette in Mr. Snake's house, and marvel at the latter's property. They convince her to go to a well outside the house, and shove her down it, and place a stone on its entrance. They then fight each other who gets to replace their sister, and Rice-Sieve Face pushes Crab-Dipper Face into a manure pit and goes to Mr. Snake's house to pass herself of as his true wife. Mr. Snake comes home and notices the woman's face is not his wife's, so Rice-Sieve Face spins a false story about shooing a porcupine and he believes in. Later, he goes to the well and removes the stone to fetch some water, when suddenly a little bird flies out of its dark depths and sings a song about Rice-Sieve Face's deception. Mr. Snake brings the little bird home, which Rice-Sieve Face kills and cooks as a meal to hide her secret. While eating the cooked bird, the meat becomes bone in her hands, which she throws outside. Lotus-Seed Face then goes through a cycle of transformations: from bone to bamboo, then to two chairs, then to ashes (since her sisters tosses the chairs in a fire). An old woman asks for a kindling and brings it home. When the old woman's grandson comes home, he tells her someone left a red turtle cake where she placed the kindling, and she goes to check, finding Lotus-Seed Face alive and asleep on a bed. The old woman calls Mr. Snake to her house, where he finds his wife alive and well, and learns of his sister-in-law's entire ploy. Back to Rice-Sieve Face, she hears a commotion outside and sees the populace coming for her. She tries to escape by jumping out of the window and running away, but she falls over the manure pit and sinks in it.

 Monguor people 
In a tale from the Monguor people titled Shilange, a youth named Shilange lives in a cottage, behind where lies a wall of beautiful flowers. In the village, a man named Old Zhang lives with his three daughters, who ask him to pluck some of the flowers behind Shilange's cottage. Old Zhang goes with an ax to cut some flowers, but he slips and his ax falls into Shilange's yard. Shilange wakes up, goes to the yard and returns the ax to Old Zhang, and asks something in return. Old Zhang offers in jest to be Shilange's matchmaker, and the youth replies he wants to marry one of the man's daughters. Old Zhang agrees, but advises that Shilange is to let go of his lazy ways. Old Man Zhang returns home and tells his daughters about it. The elder two, named Eldest Sister and Second Sister, refuse to marry Shilange due to his laziness, but Third Sister, the youngest, agrees. As the wedding date approaches, her father worries about finding good wedding garments for her, but his family is very poor. One day, Old Man Zhang sees a swarm of bees sewing garments to Third Sister. Shilange marries Third Sister, he works on improving his lazy ways and becomes a diligent man. Theirs is a happy marriage, which stirs the jealousy of Eldest Sister. One day, Eldest Sister convinces Third Sister to go to the river and wash some clothes. She suggests swapping clothes with her sister, shoves the girl in the river and, posing as her, returns to Shilange's house. Shilange notices the different physical traits of his wife, but she dimisses Shilange's suspicions with a false story. Some time later, Shilange rides his horse near the river and a colored bird perches on his sleeve. Shilange brings it home; the bird chirps to him whenever he passes and craps on the false wife. The Eldest Sister kills the bird and buries it in the yard, and a thorny bush sprouts that scratches the false wife. Eldest Sister burns the bush in the cooking stove. An old pig-herding woman goes to Shilange's house and asks for some coals. The old woman gets some coals and finds a spinning wheel she takes home. The pig-herding woman notices that, whenever she leaves home and returns, the house is clean and the food prepared. She discovers that a girl, Third Sister, comes out of the spinning wheel and adopts her as a daughter. One day, Third Sister convinces the old woman to invite Shilange and his "wife" to their house, but Eldest Sister, posing as Shilange's wife, orders the old woman to roll out red and white carpets between both houses, then to plant large trees, and perch birds in every tree. Due to Third Sister's advice, the old woman fulfills the conditions and the couple goes to the woman's house. After eating some of the food, Shilange finds a lock of glossy black hair and a golden ring in the bottom of his bowl, while Eldest Sister eats some pig excrement, vomits it up and returns home. Shilange learns that his true wife, Third Sister, is alive, who was adopted by the old woman. He goes back home to punish the false wife and welcomes Third Sister and the old woman into his house.

 Yogur people 
In a tale from the Yogur people titled Youngest Sister and Serpent Prince, a poor widowed man lives with his three daughters. One day, he goes with his ax to gather firewood to sell. He climbs a large pine tree and chops some branches, but lets his ax slip from his hands. The man climbs down the tree to get the ax back and sees a white serpent coiled around the ax. The animal explains he is the white serpent prince of the mountains, and aks one of the man's daughters in marriage in exchange for returning the ax. The man agrees and runs back home. The next day, after having a nightmare, the man tells his three daughters about the marriage proposal. The elder daughters refuse to do so, but the third daughter, Youngest Daughter, agrees to marry the snake. While she goes on a journey, she goes to sleep and has a dream about a white-haired woman. In her vision, the white-haired woman tells the girl not to be afraid, for the snake prince and his family are immortals banished from the heavens. Youngest Daughter goes to the snakes' lair to meet her husband. She enters the cave and, after the gate locks behind her, the white snake turns into a man, and so do his family, to greet her. They marry and live happily. One day, however, she begins to miss home. She goes home to visit her father and her elder sister wants to visit her brother-in-law. The Eldest Daughter goes to the snake lair and faints at the sight of the snake family. The white snake prince turns to his human form and explains to his wife that in a few days time, the snake curse on him and his family will be lifted, and they will become humans forevermore. After the curse is lifted, her middle sister, Second Daughter, visits her and admires the beauty of the snake prince's human form, so she drowns her sister in the river and passes herself off as her cadette. Some time later, the false wife takes the horse to drink in the river, but a greenfinch bothers her. The snake prince takes the greenfinch home, and it craps on the false wife's food and drink, so much so that she kills the little bird and buries it in the ground. On its grave a thorny bush sprouts and hurts the false wife whenever she walks near it. She throws the bush in the fire to burn it and from its ashes a stone spindle appears and rolls out of the cave. An old woman finds the stone spindle and brings it home. When the old woman leaves and returns home, there is milk tea and food prepared. She discovers that her mysterious housekeeper is a girl, Youngest Daughter, who comes out of the stone spindle. One day, the girl convinces the old woman to invite the serpent prince to their house, but the false wife insists some tasks to be done first. After fulfilling the tasks, the snake prince and the false wife go to the old woman house, where Youngest Daughter drops her own golden wedding ring on the snake prince's bowl of food. He discovers the truth, takes a discarded snakeskin from his house and throws it at Second Daughter, the false wife, to turn her into a coloured snake.

 Mulao people 
In a tale from the Mulao people with the title Seventh Sister and her Snake Husband, a couple have seven daughters. One day, the parents want to build a new house for their family, and decide to use a large tree at the back of their garden. The man proclaims to marry one of his seven daughters to anyone who could help him cut down the tree. A python listens to his words and offers its help. The man tells his daughters about the python's proposal. Each of them refuse to marry the animal, but the youngest, who looks at the python and sees a handsome youth in its place, decides to marry it. She goes with the serpentine husband to the edge of the sea. The python gives her an incense and, after a ritual, the sea disappears and the youth appears in place of the python. The youth reveals he is the son of the Dragon King. The seventh daughter's auspicious marriage reaches the ears of her household, and the eldest sister begins to nurture great jealousy towards her cadette. Some time later, the Seventh Sister and the Dragon Prince visither family on the occasion of her father's birthday, and Eldest Sister seizes the opportunity to toss Seventh Sister down a well and takes her place. While Eldest Sister passes her off as her cadette, a little bird comes out of the well and begins to mock her. Eldest Sister kills the bird, cooks it and throws the broth in the garden. A bamboo sprouts on the same place. The bamboo messes up Eldest Sister's hair and she asks the Dragon Prince to cut it down. The Dragon Prince goes to cut it, but the bamboo begs him to stop it. The Dragon Prince digs out the bamboo and brings it home. While he is away, the bamboo turns back to his true wife, Seventh Sister,  who sweeps the house while he is away. The Dragon Prince finds out his true wife is alive, restores her, and Eldest Sister, to avoid punishment, falls into the big water jug and drowns.

Tibet
In a Tibetan tale published by Tibetologist  in the compilation "Игра Веталы с человеком" ("Vetala's Game with a Man") with the title "Лягушонок и царевна" ("Frog and Princess"), an old woman finds an abscess on her body that bursts open and releases a frog. Despite her husband's concerns, she raises the frog as a son. Years later, the frog begins to talk and asks his mother to ask for the hand of one of the emperor's daughters. The old woman makes her case to the emperor, but is rebuffed. The frog appears at the palace and demands one of his daughters: first, he laughs, and the palace shakes; then, he cries, and a flood emerges; lastly, he hops, and the earth quakes. Afraid of the frog, the emperor questions his three daughters which will go with the frog, and only the youngest agrees. The princess is given to the frog and goes with him to the old woman's hut. The next day, the hut becomes a grand palace, and both women realize that the frog is the son of the king of dragons. Some time later, the princess asks her husband if her sisters can visit them. The frog warns her against it, since he senses something wrong about them. Despite his warnings, the princess invites her sisters. The princess, her tongue loosened by drinks, reveals the frog is the son of the king of dragons who becomes a man at night by removing the amphibian skin. The other two, growing with envy of their sister's good fortune, plot to kill and replace her. After the human prince of dragons retires to his quarters, the elder princess shoves her younger sister through the window and down a well, and wears her clothes and jewels. The human dragon prince suspects something is wrong with his wife, but remains quiet. Some time later, a walnut tree sprouts from the well, and provides sweet fruits to the dragon prince and his adoptive mother and sour fruits to the false wife. The false wife orders the tree to be felled, burnt down and its ashes scattered over a field. The ashes become barley grains and a barley field grows overnight. The false wife orders the grains to be harvested and thrown in the water. The grains then change into little birds, one of which flies to the dragon prince's arm and is taken to his palace. The little bird then reveals the man the whole treachery.

 Southeast Asia 
 Vietnam 
In a Vietnamese tale attributed to the Meo people, "Юноша в образе змеи" ("The Youth in the Form of a Snake"), a widowed father has three daughters, the youngest the most beautiful and industrious, the elder two idle and arrogant. One day, he goes to plow the fields and sees a large stone blocking his path. He tries to remove it, to no avail, and proclaims that he will give one of his daughters to anyone that can remove the stone. Suddenly, a large snake appears to offer its help, in case the man's promise is genuine. The man confirms it is and the snake moves the stone to the forest. The next day, the man goes to plow the field, and notices the snake is there, intent on cashing in on the man's promise. The man brings the snake home and asks his three daughter which will be the snake's wife. The elder two mock the snake's appearance, but the youngest invites the snake in, cooks some rice for it, and prepares a bed for it as if it is a normal guest. The girl and the snake begin to live as husband and wife. One night, the man goes to check on his third daughter and sees a youth sleeping beside her on the bed, and sees a discarded snakeskin near the bed. He hides the snakeskin somewhere no one can find it. The youth wakes up the next morning and asks his father-in-law for the snakeskin. The man tells him he got rid of the skin and that he should stay as a man. Now human, the youth and the third daughter live happily and have a son together, named Man Zu. The elder sisters, seeing her good fortune, plot to kill her and take her husband for themselves. The elder sister shoves the youngest into a cave and replaces her in the youth's bed, while she dies and becomes a bird. The youth suspects something amiss with his wife, but keeps it to himself. Some years pass, and Man Zu works in the fields and finds a cave entrance with a tree, a little bird perched on a branch. The bird talks to Man Zu and asks about his father. Man Zu tells his father about it and guides him to the tree. The youth asks the bird if it is his wife, and to perch on his arm as a sign of confirmation. The bird obeys and both men take the bird home. The false wife begins to suspect the bird is her sister, kills it, cooks and eats it. She gives some to the youth, but he refuses to eat and throws the food in the fireplace. The bird's remains become a pair of shears, hidden amidst the ashes and coals. One day, a neighbour, an old lady, comes to the house to borrow some coals for her fire, finds the shears and takes them with her. After some time, the old lady begins to notice that her house is neat and tidy and the food prepared, and no one seems to know why. One day, she pretends to leave her house and sees a girl coming out of the scissors, taking a broom and cleaning the place. The old woman surprises the girl and asks her to live with her as her daughter. Time passes and Man Zu visits the old lady, noticing the new girl and wondering if she could be his mother. Man Zu plucks a strand of her hair and brings to his father, who notices it is his wife's. With a stratagem, Man Zu lures the girl to his father's house, who takes her in, although she resists it at first. The snake youth hides his reborn wife in a room and warns her to lock it up. One day, however, the elders sisters visit the snake youth and, seeing the unlocked room, realize their sister is alive, but their first thought is about her lustrous hair. The reborn youngest sister simply tells them she boils a pot of hot water and, leaning on top of three benches, washes her hair in the boiling water. The sisters return home to repeat the procedure and fall into the boiling water. The compilers located its source from an informant in the Bac Ha province, and noted its proximity to the international tale type 433.

In a tale from the Koho people (Sre), translated into Russian as "Властитель вод" ("The Lord of Waters"), a man has two daughters, Nga and Nzi. One day, the man finds a snake in the forest, which demands one of the man's daughter in marriage. The man offer Nga, but the snake rejects it. The man then offers Nzi, and the animal accepts it. The man returns home and tells Nzi of the incident, and the girl decides to offer herself to the snake to protect the village. Nzi goes to the shore to wait for the snake, secretly followed by her sister Nga. Nga sees the snake and runs back home. The snake turns into a young man, Trachanlan, the lord of the waters, and spends the night with his bride. The next day, Nzi wakes up first, sees her husband's snakeskin, and buries it in the sand. Trachanlan wakes up next and ask Nzi about the snakeskin, but the girl feigns ignorance. Later, he asks the animals about it, and discovers Nzi hid out of fear he may devour her. He promises he will not do such a thing. One day, Nzi and Trachanlan visit her father, Zobuo; Nga notices her brother-in-law's beauty, and intends to get rid of her sister. Trachanlan asks his father-in-law to not allow Nzi out of the house, for he is going on a journey to the country of the tyams. While he is away. Nga convinces her sister to go for a walk on the beach, despite Zobuo's orders against it. Nzi takes an orange and an egg with her, and is murdered by Nga, who goes home to pass herself off as Trachanlan's wife. The Sun, a relative of Trachanlan, witnesses the murders and orders two fishes to come fetch Nzi's body. Nzi revives and, after four days, goes back to the shore with a son in tow (since she was pregnant), and plants the orange in the ground. A large orange tree sprouts. The egg she carried with her hatched and produced a rooster. Later, Trachanlan oars around and comes to buy some oranges from a boy (not knowing the boy as his son). They recognize each other and sail together back home - after Trachanlan, in serpent form, fought a sea deity - and rejoin with their family. The boy hits Nga on the head with a plate, but Trachanlan asks his son to forgive her, and go to the orange tree to call out for Nzi to come down the tree. The tale continues as Trachanlan goes away on another journey, and Nga tries to kill Nzi in two other occasions. After two more foiled attempts, she decides to find a snake for her to marry, hoping to repeat her sister's success. However, Nga finds a snake that devours her. Trachanlan learns of this and rescues his sister-in-law, despite her previous behaviour. Nga comes out of the snake's stomach alive, but scarred all over her body. Trachanlan warns her not to go out in the midday sun, but Nga does and turns into a lizard.

 Indonesia 
In an Indonesian tale from Halmahera translated into Hungarian as Gyíkkirály ("The Lizard King"), a couple has a lizard for a son. One day, the lizard passes by a lake where four women are bathing and falls in love with one of them. He tries to woo the maiden by knocking down some flowers from a tjampaka tree. He courts the youngest maiden as a lizard, but becomes a man at night. His bride burns the lizard skin so that he remains human at all times. The next morning, the now human lizard son warns his bride against it. Seeing the handsome youth, instead of a lizard, the three sisters become jealous and conspire to get rid of their sister and marry the youth. He goes on a boat trip to get a dowry for her, but gives her an areca nut and a rooster's egg before he leaves. After he goes away, the three sisters try to kill the lizard youth's bride, but she survives every attempt. A rooster that hatches from the egg takes the maiden to the lizard king's ship. The lizard king disembarks and visits his sisters-in-law. He tells them he brought them a present: two chests, just lying on the beach. The three sisters-in-law, hoping to find something precious inside, run to the beach and open up the chests in a hurry. Inside, only needles and knives, which spring out of the chests and kill the envious sisters.

 Myanmar 
In a Burmese tale titled The Snake Prince, a widow lives in a cottage by the river with her three daughters, and earns her living by gathering firewood. She also tries to fetch fruits in the woods whenever she can. One day, she tries to find some fallen figs from a fig tree and, not finding any, insults the tree. Suddenly, a snake appears to her, with figs in its coils. The widow sees the figs and offers one of her daughters in marriage to the snake (whom she calls Lord Nāga): Ma U (the eldest), Ma Lat (the middle one) and Ma Htwe (the youngest). The snake releases the figs after it hears the proposition, and the widow seizes the opportunity to fetch the figs in a basket. On the road home, the woman passes by a tree stump, a hillock and a boulder, to which she gives a fig if they lies to the snake that she passes by them. The snake, a Naga, follows the widow to her cottage, and passes by the tree stump, the hillock and the boulder, and creeps into a rice pot. The widow opens up the lid and the snake coils itself around her arm, chastising her for trying to trick it. The widow repeats her offer for the snake to release her arm, and goes to talk to her daughters: the elder two refuse to maryr the snake, but Ma Htwe agrees to be with the reptile, gives some milk and rice to ti and takes it in a basket to her room. The next morning, Ma Htwe has a dream that a man came in and embraced her. Her mother says she will check into the matter and, that same night, sees a human youth coming out of the snake's basket and embracing her youngest daughter. She takes the snakeskin and throws it in the fire. The human snake begins to writhe in pain; Ma Htwe wakes up and goes to the kitchen to fetch some cool water and pours it on the youth's skin. After curing his burning, the youth explains he is a Naga Prince, and, without his snakeskin, shall live as a mortal beside her. Ma Htwe and the Naga Prince move out to a cottage and have a son they name Kin Shwe (Prince Golden). The Naga Prince decides to find work with a merchant, and sails away, leaving his family alone to deal with the elder sisters' envy, who plot to get rid of Ma Htwe. They approach hr and try to draw her out of her house, but she stays home. One day, they convince her to accompany them for a picnic near a mango tree, for old times' sake, so they could play at a swing . Ma Htwe climbs onto the swing and is shoved by her sisters into the sea, but she and her child are rescued by a large stork. Meanwhile, the Naga Prince is coming back from his journey, and listens to his wife's voice, and finds her in the stork's nest. He makes a deal with the large bird and rescues his wife. The Naga Prince wants to punish his sisters-in-law with death, but Ma Htwe decides they must be publicly shamed, so he places his wife in an empty chest. When he disembarks, he asks his sisters-in-law to carry the heavy chest to the village. They open the chest, and out comes Ma Htwe and her son.

 South Asia 
 India 
Professor Sadhana Naithani published a tale originally collected by William Crooke. In this tale, two sisters, Sonth and Ganth, live together, and each has a daughter. On her deathbed, Sonth asks her sister to make her own daughter remove the cow-dung, and Ganth's daughter cook food. After she dies, Ganth inverts her dead sister's request. When the girls attain marriageable age, Ganth asks her husband to find a good husband for her daughter and a snake for her niece (Sonth's daughter). The human son-in-law brings silver jewelry for his bride, while the snake brings golden pieces. Sonth also had a son, and, after his sister's marriage to a snake, leaves for Benares. Back to the cousins, the one married to a snake cooks food in her mother-in-law's home, while the Gânth's daughter does know how to cook food and is expelled from her house. Gânth's daughter goes to her cousin's house and is welcomed to live with her. The snake's mother asks her daughter-in-law how her son sleeps at night, and the girl says he takes off the skin at night. The snake's mother advises her to take the snakeskin and burn it. The girl does that and, where her hand is touching the snakeskin, it becomes gold. Later, Gânth's daughter invites her cousin to take a bath, and suggests they exchange clothes and ornaments. Gânth's sister then shoves her cousin into the river and she is washed away to Benares, where she is found by her own brother. Meanwhile, Gânth's daughter enters the snake's house and tells him his cousin drowned. Later, the snake, now a man, visits his brother-in-law in Benares on a pilmigrage and discovers the whole truth. The snake goes back home and banishes his sister-in-law.

 Nepal 
In a Nepalese tale collected in Mustang with the title Der Hundebräutigam ("The Hound Bridegroom"), a woman has three unmarried daughters, which saddens her. So, she plays a ruse on them: she pretends to be on her deathbed and asks for her daughters to bring her some grass and water from a remote valley. Each of three daughters goes down to the valley to fetch the cure, when they are met by a hound that claims to own the valley. The hound allows each girl to go back with the grass and water, if they agree to marry him; the elder two refuse, while the youngest agrees to marry the hound in order to save her mother. Later, after she is given the cure, the mother hides her youngest under a cauldron in order to fool the dog, but the animal comes and takes his bride. The duo traverse a lake, then pass by a silver castle, a golden castle, and a castle made of dog excrement, where they live in abundance. Inside the third house, an old woman advises the girl to burn the dog's skin after he sleeps. She does and the dog becomes a human king named Kyirken Gambala ("older dog Gambala"). Despite his complaints, he forgives his wife for the deed. Later, he goes on a hunt and gives a set of keys to his wife. While he is away, she opens doors of silver, gold and coral, and goes down a mother-of-pearl staircase. Down the stairs, she can see the whole world: her elder sisters have married, but her parents are ill. She convinces her husband to visit them and bring presents. Kyirken Gambala and his wife go to her parents' house, and her elder sister grow jealous. The elder takes the cadette to a lake, shoves her into the water and takes her clothes. Kyirken Gambala goes back with his "wife", despite some suspicions about her new behaviour, like preparing a lord's meal for the servants and a servant's meal for him. Some time later, Kyirken Gambala is told about a bird that appears by the lake; he takes it in a cage and hangs it at home. The false wife kills the bird, cooks it with rice and serves it to Kyirken. The man notices the taste of bird meat and throws it away; some plants sprout in its place. The false wife orders the plants to be made into firewood; a poor couple fetches some, bring it with them and place it in a box. In the poor couple's house, the girl asks for the box to be opened, so she can come out, and gives the old couple her husband's golden ring. Later, the king receives the old couple and notices his ring on the old man's finger, and inquires about it. His true wife appears in the room and the false wife burns to ashes. Kyirken Gambala takes his true wife back.

In another Nepalese tale also titled Der Hundebräutigam ("The Hound Bridegroom"), a poor couple live with their three daughters in a town. One day, a giant yellow dog comes to their house with a sack of money, and leaves the sack with the couple, but promises to return in two or three years. The couple's eldest daughter insists they should spend the money on dresses and jewels for them, since the dog may never return. The couple agree, but three years later, the dog does return and demands its sack back. Knowing the couple spent it, the animal then demands one of their daughters in exchange; the elder two refuse, but the youngest agrees and goes with the dog. The girl lives with the dog and gives birth to two white puppies and a white one, but feels ashamed about her situation. The dog, however, goes to a palace, and the girl follows after him with the puppies. She discovers her husband is truly a human king under the canine skin, and lives happily with him. Some time later, the girl worries about her family's financial situation, since she lives in luxury, and convinces her husband to let her visit them. The girl pays a visit to their family in fine garments, to the jealousy of the elder sisters, who plot to kill her and take her place: the elder two shove their cadette into the lake, take their jewels and clothes, and go back to the king. They spin a story about their sister staying with their parents, and they are to live in the palace with their nephews. Meanwhile, a tree sprouts in the lake, and a small bird perches on its branches to ask a shepherd about the king in dog skin and its children. The shepherd informs the king, who goes to the lake to listen to the bird's lament. The king takes the bird with him and places it in a box; seven days later, his true wife comes out of it more beautiful than ever. With his wife back, the king orders his sisters-in-law to be banished from his palace, never to return.

 Lisu people 
Professor Paul Durrenberger collected a tale from the Lisu people: a widow goes near the lake to cut grass for her horse and sees a tree with seven beautiful flowers she plucks for her seven daughters. When she is ready to leave, she tries to lift the basket she brought with her, but it is to heavy. She checks inside the basket and sees a dragon in the bottom, who begins to talk and demands the widow surrenders one of her seven daughters to him, otherwise he will kill the woman. The widow goes home and asks her seven daughters which will go with the dragon: each of them refuses to be the dragon's bride, save the youngest, who agrees to live with the dragon to spare her mother's life. The girl goes to the dragon's path and sees a man who asks to delouse him. She does as asked and sees a scaly skin on his head, releasing a scream that scares the man into the jungle. She meets the man again down the road, who says he will take her on his, but she cannot open her eyes during the journey, even if she hears seven doors opening and closing. It happens as the man says, and both reach a large golden palace, where even the tableware and chopsticks are made of gold. The man says he is the dragon, they marry and she gives birth to a son. Some time later, the girl's eldest sister pays them a visit, and says their mother wants to eat a fruit from the dragon's tree. The girl says she cannot climb the tree and carry her son in her arms, so she gives the baby to her sister. However, the baby begins to cry, and the eldest sister lies that he is crying for his mother's clothes. The girl takes off all her clothes and gives them to her sisters, climbs the tree naked and gets the fruit. The eldest sister takes the opportunity to shove her sister in the lake, where she drowns, wears all her clothes and pass herself as the dragon's true wife. She enters the dragon's palace, who does not recognize the woman as his wife, since they are physically different. The woman spins a story that she was away at her mother's house for so long that she physically changed when she slept in the hearth and insects ate her hair, which the dragon believes. One day, he sends his elder son to fetch grass for their horse, but twice he cannot do so due to bug bites. He goes a third and last time, and hear a bird singing about how the king is blind. The dragon's elder son takes his father to listen to the bird's song, and he takes the little bird with them. However, the little bird defecates on the utensils. This greatly angers the dragon, who kills it, cooks it and gives its flesh to the false wife's son and the bones to his own, but the former's food becomes bones and the latter's meat. The bird's meat and bones are tosses in the fireplace to burn, and the girl, continuing her cycle of transformations, becomes a pair of scissors, a bush, and a dog, which is taken in by an old woman. While the old woman leaves home to work in the fields, the dog becomes the girl and cooks for her. One day, she is discovered and adopted by the old woman. Later, the girl tells the woman to invite the dragon king to her house for a meal, but the dragon dismisses the woman's humble abode, and will only go if she can produce a golden palace with golden furniture. The girl provides the woman with some magical help, and builds the golden palace for the dragon. The dragon comes with the false wife and sees his true spouse in the old woman's house. To settle the dispute, he plants a golden and a silver spear on the ground, over which both sisters are to jump, whichever survives shall be proclaimed his true wife. The elder sister jumps over her three times, and dies impaled on third time, while the youngest sister jumps over hers and survives, thus regaining her status as the dragon's wife.

 Uzbekistan 
In a Uzbek tale translated into Russian as "СЕСТРЫ" ("Sisters"), an old woman lives with her three daughters. She goes to fetch firewood in the mountains and finds a serpent inside the bundle. The animal asks for one of the woman's daughters as his wife, so she returns home and questions her daughters: the elder two refuse, but only the youngest agrees to marry the serpent. The girl accompanies the serpent to a large palace deep within a forest, and the animal becomes a human youth. They marry and she gives birth to a child. Some time later, the girl begins to miss her family and wishes to visit them. She goes back home in splendid clothes and adorned with jewels, which greatly fuels the eldest sister's jealousy. After the girl's visit, the elder sister decides to accompany back home. Near the serpent's palace, the elder sister shoves her cadette down the river and wears her clothes. When she comes home, the serpent asks her about the physical changes on her face and skin, and she provides a flimsy excuse that manages to fool him. Time passes, when the serpent's son is nine years old, he grazes his father's flocks of sheep; a litle bird perches next to him and sings a song. The boy informs his father of this and the serpent brings the little bird home. At home, the little bird's song mocks the serpent's false wife, who becomes irritated, kills the bird and throws the bones in the yard. Where the bones landed, a pair of scissors appeared. Once again, the false wife takes the scissors and throw them out of the window. A neighbouring lonely woman finds the object and brings it home; whenever she is not at home, the serpent's true wife, assuming a new form, cleans the old woman's house and prepares her food. The next day, the old woman discovers the girl and decides to adopt her. Some time later, the girl, under her new identity, pays a visit to the serpent's house, and his son indicates she is his true mother. Hearing this, the serpent sets a test to verify his wife's identity: both women are to walk through thorny thickets; whichever of them is "without sin" shall be left unharmed. The girl passes without any problem, while the false wife steps on the thorns, the bushes prickle her skin and she dies. The serpent's true wife is restored to her rightful place.

 Georgia 
European scholars Bengt Holbek and John Lindow stated that a similar narrative is "sporadically" found in Georgia. In this tale, an old person gives her third and youngest daughter to a draconic being as its bride; the girl goes to live with the dragon, who takes off its skin and becomes a handsome man; the youngest has a child with the dragon-man, and later visits her sisters; the elder sister begins to envy her cadette, abandons her up an apple tree and goes to live with the dragon-man as his wife. Back to the real wife, she cries so much she melts into a puddle that falls on the ground; where the puddle lands, a reed sprouts, which her son uses to fashion a flute that begins to sing of the elder sister's treachery. Fearing the truth may be discovered, the elder sister, posing as the dragon-man's wife, breaks the flute in two and tosses it in the fireplace. However, she takes the ashes and throws them away; a poplar tree sprouts in its place which the false wife also destroys, save for a piece of wood an old woman takes with herself. The true wife comes out of the piece of wood and tells the truth to her husband.

 Literary versions 
Children's books author Laurence Yep adapted a tale from Southern China in his work The Dragon Prince: A Chinese Beauty and the Beast Tale'': a farmer has seven daughters, the seventh, named Seven, is industrious and talented, while her sister, Three, is ugly and lazy. One day, Seven finds a golden snake in the fields, takes it and releases it back into the water. The snake becomes a large dragon that threatens the farmer for one of his daughters in marriage. Only Seven offers to marry the dragon to save her father. The dragon takes Seven to his underwater palace and assumes a human form. They marry. Later, Seven visits her family with gifts and her sister Three, jealous of Seven's good fortune, tries to kill her by shoving her in the river and taking her place as the dragon's wife. Her plan fails, for the dragon eventually finds his true wife under an old woman's care.

See also
 King Lindworm (ATU 433B)
 Champavati (AaTh 433C)
 Animal as Bridegroom
 The Story of Tam and Cam
 Beauty and Pock Face
 The Boys with the Golden Stars
 
 Sandrembi and Chaisra

References

Further reading
 Chieh-Yi Lin. "中國民間蛇郎類型故事研究" [A study on snake-bridegroom stories of Chinese folktales]. Monograph for master's degree. 2012. (In Chinese)
 Chi-ru Cheng. "台灣地區蛇郎君故事研究". 2000. (In Chinese)

Asian fairy tales
Chinese fairy tales
Fictional snakes
Male characters in fairy tales
Female characters in fairy tales
Fiction about shapeshifting
ATU 400-459
ATU 700-749